Cathedral bells is a common name for several plants and may refer to:

Bryophyllum pinnatum, native to Madagascar
Cobaea scandens, native to Mexico